Singapore participated in the 2009 Asian Indoor Games held in Hanoi, Vietnam on 30 October – 8 November 2009. 39 athletes competed in six events - Bowling, Cuesports, Dancesport, Indoor Petanque, Silat and Xiangqi. Vincent Eu was the Chef de Mission of the Singapore contingent.

The contingent won a total of ten medals, consisting of 1 gold medal, 6 silver medals and 3 bronze medals.

Participants

Medals

References 

Singapore at the Asian Games
Nations at the 2009 Asian Indoor Games
2009 in Singaporean sport